Alex Tamáši (born 25 March 1998) is a Slovak professional ice hockey player who currently playing for HC '05 Banská Bystrica of the Slovak Extraliga.

Career statistics

Regular season and playoffs

International

References

External links
 

1998 births
Living people
Slovak ice hockey centres
HC '05 Banská Bystrica players
HC 07 Detva players
MHk 32 Liptovský Mikuláš players
Bratislava Capitals players
Sportspeople from Rimavská Sobota